Andrea De Nicolao (born 21 August 1991) is an Italian professional basketball player who plays for Reyer Venezia of the Italian Lega Basket Serie A (LBA) and the EuroCup.

Professional career
De Nicolao progressed through the youth ranks of Pallacanestro Vigodarzere (with stints at Virtus Padova and Petrarca Padova), a team coached by his father. Moving to Benetton Treviso in 2008, he won the under-19 national title with the side at the end of his first season.
He made his debut in the Serie A on 12 October 2009, playing a little less than seven minutes per game over the rest of the season. The youngster was then loaned to lower league side Lago Maggiore the next season, returning in 2011.
His second season with Treviso saw him collect 16.5 minutes of playing time per game, for 3.5 points and 1.1 assist.
De Nicolao moved to fellow Serie A side Cimberio Varese in 2012, gradually increasing his minutes and statistical output over the next two seasons, he was nominated for the Serie A best player under 22 award for 2012-13, finishing third.
After a season in the second division Serie A2 with Tezenis Verona, posting 10.3 points and a league-best 6.4 assists per game, De Nicolao joined Grissin Bon Reggio Emilia in 2015.

In May 2018, De Nicolao won the FIBA Europe Cup championship with Reyer Venezia. He re-signed with Reyer Venezia for two seasons with a third year option on June 18, 2020.

International career
De Nicolao played with Italian representative sides in each age group from the Under-16's to the Under-18's through to the Under-20's. With the latter, he earned a silver medal at the 2011 European Championship, posting 11 points and 9 boards in the final.

He made his fully fledged debut for the senior national team in July 2014.

References

External links
Serie A profile  Retrieved 1 September 2015
RealGM profile Retrieved 1 September 2015
Official website  Retrieved 1 September 2015

1991 births
Living people
Italian men's basketball players
Lega Basket Serie A players
Pallacanestro Reggiana players
Pallacanestro Treviso players
Pallacanestro Varese players
People from Camposampiero
Reyer Venezia players
Scaligera Basket Verona players
Sportspeople from the Province of Padua
Point guards